Hanoi University Of Public Health (Vietnamese: Trường Đại học Y tế công cộng) is an University in Vietnam specializing in Public Health Training and Research. It was established in 2001.

External links

Universities in Vietnam
Health in Vietnam
Schools of public health
Educational institutions established in 2001
2001 establishments in Vietnam